Leptoneta is a genus of leptonetids that was first described by Eugène Louis Simon in 1872.

Species
 it contains 50 species:
L. abeillei Simon, 1882 – Spain, France
L. albera Simon, 1882 – France
L. alpica Simon, 1882 – France
L. berlandi Machado & Ribera, 1986 – Portugal
L. cavalairensis Dresco, 1987 – France
L. chilbosanensis Kim, Yoo & Lee, 2016 — Korea
L. ciaisensis Dresco, 1987 – France
L. comasi Ribera, 1978 – Spain
L. condei Dresco, 1987 – France
L. conimbricensis Machado & Ribera, 1986 – Portugal
L. convexa Simon, 1872 (type) – France
Leptoneta c. aulotensis Dresco, 1990 – France
L. cornea Tong & Li, 2008 – China
L. corsica Fage, 1943 – France (Corsica)
L. crypticola Simon, 1907 – France
Leptoneta c. franciscoloi Caporiacco, 1950 – Italy
L. fagei Simon, 1914 – France
L. fouresi Dresco, 1979 – France
L. handeulgulensis Namkung, 2002 – Korea
L. hogyegulensis Paik & Namkung, 1969 – Korea
L. hongdoensis Paik, 1980 – Korea
L. infuscata Simon, 1872 – Spain (mainland, Majorca), France
Leptoneta i. ovetana Machado, 1939 – Spain
L. insularis Roewer, 1953 – Sardinia
L. jangsanensis Seo, 1989 – Korea
L. jeanneli Simon, 1907 – France
L. kernensis Simon, 1910 – Algeria
L. kwangreungensis Kim, Jung, Kim & Lee, 2004 – Korea
L. lantosquensis Dresco, 1987 – France
L. leucophthalma Simon, 1907 – Spain
L. manca Fage, 1913 – France
L. miaoshiensis Chen & Zhang, 1993 – China
L. microphthalma Simon, 1872 – France
L. naejangsanensis Paik & Seo, 1982 – Korea
L. namhensis Paik & Seo, 1982 – Korea
L. namkungi Kim, Jung, Kim & Lee, 2004 – Korea
L. olivacea Simon, 1882 – France
L. paikmyeonggulensis Paik & Seo, 1984 – Korea
L. paroculus Simon, 1907 – Spain
L. patrizii Roewer, 1953 – Sardinia
L. proserpina Simon, 1907 – France
L. seogwipoensis Kim, Ye & Kim, 2015 – Korea
L. serbariuana Roewer, 1953 – Sardinia
L. soryongensis Paik & Namkung, 1969 – Korea
L. spinipalpus Kim, Lee & Namkung, 2004 – Korea
L. taeguensis Paik, 1985 – Korea
L. taramellii Roewer, 1956 – Sardinia
L. trabucensis Simon, 1907 – France
L. vittata Fage, 1913 – France
L. waheulgulensis Namkung, 1991 – Korea
L. yongyeonensis Seo, 1989 – Korea

See also
 List of Leptonetidae species

References

Araneomorphae genera
Leptonetidae
Spiders of Asia